Local justice areas are units in England and Wales established by the Courts Act 2003, replacing and directly based on the previous petty sessional divisions. They have been in existence since 2005.

Whilst previously, local justice areas were used to determine which magistrates' courts may hear a particular case, since 1 April 2015, any magistrates' court in England and Wales may hear any case from anywhere in England and Wales. 

The areas established were identical to the petty sessional divisions. They have since been amended by the merger of South Pembrokeshire and North Pembrokeshire to a single Pembrokeshire local justice area, and the merger of De Maldwyn and Welshpool to a single Montgomeryshire local justice area – this change came into force in 2006, although the magistrates already shared the same courtroom.

A further amendment occurred in 2006 when the areas of Shrewsbury, Oswestry and Drayton were combined to become a new area named Shrewsbury and North Shropshire. The areas of Telford and Bridgnorth and South Shropshire were also combined to become a new area named Telford and South Shropshire.

A major rearrangement culminated in April 2017, when many local justice areas were amalgamated to leave 75 across England and Wales.  

Each local justice area was part of a larger courts board area, which replaced the magistrates' courts committee areas with the inauguration of Her Majesty's Courts Service in 2005.  Courts boards were abolished in 2012. 

Local Justice Areas will be abolished once Section 45 of the Judicial Review and Courts Act 2022 is brought into force.

Post 2017 Local Justice Areas 

These are the Local Justice Areas as lasted merged by The Local Justice Areas Order 2016, in effect from 1 April 2017: 

 Avon and Somerset replaces the areas of Bristol, North Avon and Somerset.
 Cardiff replaces the areas of Newcastle and Ogmore and Cardiff and the Vale of Glamorgan.
 Cambridgeshire replaces the areas of Huntingdonshire, North Cambridgeshire and South Cambridgeshire. 
 Cheshire replaces the areas of North Cheshire, South and East Cheshire, and West Cheshire.
 Cleveland replaces the areas of Hartlepool and Teesside.
 Dorset replaces the areas of East Dorset and West Dorset. 
 East Hampshire replaces the areas of South East Hampshire and South Hampshire.
 Greater Manchester replaces the areas of Bolton, Bury and Rochdale, Manchester and Salford, Oldham, Stockport, Tameside, Trafford, and Wigan and Leigh. 
 Humber replaces the areas of East Yorkshire, Grimsby and Cleethorpes, Hull and Holderness, and North Lincolnshire.
 Lancashire replaces the areas of Burnley, Pendle and Rossendale, Chorley, East Lancashire, Fylde Coast, Lancaster, Ormskirk, and Preston and South Ribble. 
 Merseyside replaces the areas of Liverpool and Knowsley, Sefton, St Helens, and Wirral.
 Mid Wales replaces the areas of Brecknock and Radnorshire and Glamorgan Valleys.
 Northamptonshire replaces the areas of Corby, Kettering, and Northampton, Daventry and Towcester, and Wellingborough.
 North Central Wales replaces the areas of Conwy and Denbighshire.
 North Northumbria replaces the areas of Berwick-upon-Tweed, Mid and South East Northumberland, Newcastle and Tynedale, and North Tyneside District. 
 North West Wales replaces the areas of Gwynedd and Ynys Môn/ Anglesey.
 North Yorkshire replaces the areas of Harrogate and Skipton, Northallerton and Richmond, Scarborough and York and Selby. 
 South Northumbria replaces the areas of Gateshead District, City of Sunderland and South Tyneside District. 
 South Yorkshire replaces the areas of Barnsley District, Doncaster, Rotherham, and Sheffield.
 Staffordshire replaces the areas of Central and Southwest Staffordshire, North Staffordshire, and South East Staffordshire.
 Surrey replaces the areas of North Surrey, South East Surrey, and South West Surrey.
 West Sussex replaces the areas of Sussex (Northern) and Sussex (Western)
 West Yorkshire replaces the areas of Bradford and Keighley, Calderdale, Kirklees, Leeds District, and Wakefield and Pontefract.

See also 
 Magistrates' court (England and Wales)
 Courts Act 2003
 Petty sessional division

References

External links 
Courts Act 2003
The Local Justice Areas Order 2016

Politics of England
Politics of Wales
Courts of England and Wales